Assistive technology in sport is an area of technology design that is growing. Assistive technology is the array of new devices created to enable sports enthusiasts who have disabilities to play. Assistive technology may be used in disabled sports, where an existing sport is modified to enable players with a disability to participate; or, assistive technology may be used to invent completely new sports with athletes with disabilities exclusively in mind.

An increasing number of people with disabilities are participating in sports, leading to the development of new assistive technology. Assistive technology devices can be simple, "low-tech", or they may use highly advanced technology, with some even using computers. Assistive technology for sports may also be simple or advanced. Accordingly, assistive technology can be found in sports ranging from local community recreation to elite Paralympic games. More complex assistive technology devices have been developed over time, and as a result, sports for people with disabilities "have changed from being a clinical therapeutic tool to an increasingly competition-oriented activity".

Assistive devices
Assistive devices can enable exercise and training, on top of enabling participation in a sport. Below are some of the assistive devices currently available for different impairments:

 Mobility impairments: 
 Light-weight wheelchairs for basketball, tennis, and racing
 All-terrain wheelchairs with rugged frames and wheels for rolling over unpaved surfaces, like hiking trails, snow, or beach sand
 Handcycles, or recumbent bicycles, which are like bicycles with pedals and steering using only the rider's arms
 Cross-country sit skis that allow skiers to sit down and push along the trail with tips that dig into the snow
 Weights that users strap onto their wrists rather than having to hold them with the hands
 Gym equipment that lets users stay in a wheelchair while using arm exercise machines
 Mitts with Velcro straps that help users to hold onto an exercise machine if their grip isn't strong enough
 Elastic band or tubes that exercise muscles through resistance instead of weight
 Paramobile devices such as specialized golf carts with support for standing assist players with mobility disabilities
 Bowling balls with hand grips assist bowlers with limited use of their hands
 One-handed fishing rods assist fishers who have limited mobility
 Visual impairments: 
 Softballs that beep, so that people with visual problems can locate the ball to hit and catch it
 Basketballs with jingle bells inside for people who have limited or no eyesight

Sports using assistive technology
Sports that use assistive technology may include the following:

Accessible Fishing & Hunting
Accessible Sailing / Boating / Kayaking
Adaptive Archery
Adaptive Bowling
Adaptive Flying
Adaptive Golf
Adaptive Horseback Riding/Equestrian
Adaptive Scuba Diving
Adaptive Shooting
Adaptive Skiing & Snowboarding
Adaptive Table Tennis
Adaptive Water Sports
Extreme Wheelchair Sports
Handcycling
Power Soccer
Quad Rugby
Sled, Floor & Power Hockey
Wheelchair Basketball
Wheelchair Curling
Wheelchair Fencing
Wheelchair Lacrosse
Wheelchair Pool and Billiards
Wheelchair Racing and Field Sports
Wheelchair Baseball
Wheelchair Softball 
Wheelchair Table Tennis
Wheelchair Tennis
Wheelchair Volleyball
Wheelchair Weightlifting

Many of the sports listed above have attained international elite sport status, being included in the Paralympic Games.

Sports requiring assistive technology
Some sports have developed with the goal of creating a challenge that players with a disability could enjoy. These sports require assistive technology for all players as part of the game. Some examples are: Sledge (sled) hockey; wheelchair basketball; adaptive sailing, with boats designed especially for sailors with disabilities; Nordic (cross-country) skiing with "sit-ski" buckets; and handcycling races.

Sport wheelchair design
Sport wheelchairs are designed for the requirements of specific sports. Power chairs can also be fitted with assistive devices that are temporary adaptations to the demands of a sport, such as a kick plate attached to a power chair for powerchair football (power soccer).

Light-weight frames are a necessity for wheelchairs used in sports requiring sharp, fast turns and overall agility, such as tennis, basketball, and racing.

Chairs with reinforced frames and impact protection are required for contact sports, such as wheelchair rugby or basketball.

Racing chairs are designed with bucket seats, angled wheels for improved stability, and a t-frame with a third wheel in front, allowing precision steering and improved balance. The athlete and wheelchair are viewed together by some sport researchers as a unified performance system. Improvements can be made to chairs by evaluating the chair and athlete separately or in performance conditions together.

Prosthetics
Prosthetic devices come in a variety of designs suited to different athletic purposes. Prosthetic legs may be designed for rock climbing, running, or jumping. The technology is designed to attain goals, such as greater gait efficiency when running. The technology is constantly improving to meet the demands of athletes who set ever-higher sports challenges for themselves.

In 2008, the International Association of Athletics Federations (IAAF) began a worldwide debate when they established Rule 144.2(e), prohibiting the use of technical devices that offer a competitive advantage. South African athlete Oscar Pistorius, using energy-storing prosthetic legs, fought for the right to run against able-bodied athletes in the 2008 Olympic and Paralympic Games, and won the right to compete, although he did not meet the qualifying time required for the traditional able-bodied competitions.

Functional classification
Functional classification systems are used to evaluate and categorize athletes in elite sports. The classification determines the type and extent of assistive technology use by the athlete.

Organizations
Organizations and associations at the national and international level support the development of adaptive sport and recreation, often through the use of assistive technology for players. These organizations are "growing in number and scope". 
International Paralympic Committee - the global body responsible for many sports up to international elite level competition.
Disabled Sports USA - The national organization that provides over 40 different adaptive sports to over 60,000 people with disabilities in the US through a network of over 100 community-based chapters. 
 Adapted Physical Activity Council (APAC), a council of the American Association for Physical Activity and Recreation

Obstacles 
Assistive technology has made sports accessible to many athletes who would have otherwise not been able to play. However, it has its downfalls. This technology is expensive, so many people will never have access to it. It can be subject to abuse, as some people use the technology when they don't actually need it. There have been rulings that athletes who use assistive technology have an advantage over "able-bodied" athletes.

See also
Assistive technology
Inclusive recreation
Paralympics

References

Parasports
Assistive technology
Sports equipment